Gene Mayer was the defending champion, but did not participate this year.

Tomáš Šmíd won the singles title of the 1983 BMW Open, defeating Joakim Nyström 6–0, 6–3, 4–6, 2–6, 7–5 in the final.

Seeds

  Tomáš Šmíd (champion)
  Mel Purcell (first round)
  Shlomo Glickstein (first round)
  Mike De Palmer (second round)
  Fernando Luna (quarterfinals)
  Pavel Složil (quarterfinals)
  Chris Lewis (quarterfinals)
  Jairo Velasco, Sr. (second round)

Draw

Final

Section 1

Section 2

External links
 1983 Bavarian Tennis Championships Singles draw

Singles